Kittisak Tanasuwan (born 8 December 1980) is a Thai retired footballer who played for Port Authority of Thailand (2001–2008) and Thai Port (2009). He played one competitive match for the Thailand national team, as a first-half substitute in a 2010 World Cup qualifying match against Macau. Kittisak also played for his country in a non-FIFA match against Iraq in 2006.

References

External links
 Official Website
 

1980 births
Living people
Kittisak Tanasuwan
Association football midfielders
Kittisak Tanasuwan
Kittisak Tanasuwan